Ruthenian or Ruthene may refer to:

Places
 Ruthenia, a name applied to various East Slavic inhabited lands
 White Ruthenia, an East Slavic historical region
 Black Ruthenia, an East Slavic historical region
 Red Ruthenia, an East Slavic historical region
 Carpathian Ruthenia, a historical region inhabited mostly by Rusyns (Rusynia)
 Ruthenian Voivodeship, a historical province (1434–1772)

Peoples
 Ruthenians, an exonymic name applied to various East Slavic peoples:
 Ukrainians, sometimes referred to (in historical context) as South Ruthenians
 Belarusians, sometimes referred to (in historical context) as White Ruthenians
 Rusyns, sometimes referred to as Carpatho-Ruthenians

Languages
 Old East Slavic, language of the medieval Rus' (sometimes referred to as Ruthenian)
 Ruthenian language, East Slavic language of the Polish-Lithuanian Commonwealth and the Habsburg Monarchy
 Ukrainian language, sometimes referred to (in historical context) as South Ruthenian
 Belarusian language, sometimes referred to (in historical context) as White Ruthenian
 Rusyn language, sometimes referred to as Carpatho-Ruthenian
 Russian language, sometimes also included in the widest scope of Ruthenian designations

Religion
 Ruthenian Rite, an exonymic designation for the East Slavic form of the Byzantine Rite
 Ruthenian Catholic Church (historical), that existed from the 15th to the 18th century
 Ruthenian Byzantine Catholic Church, one of the 23 particular (sui iuris) Eastern Catholic Churches

Other
 Ruthenian nobility, East Slavic nobility of the Polish-Lithuanian Commonwealth and the Habsburg Monarchy
 Minerals containing the element ruthenium

See also
 
 Ruthenia (disambiguation)
 Ruthenian Americans (disambiguation)
 Rusyn (disambiguation)

Language and nationality disambiguation pages